A music download is the transfer of music as a digital file from a provider (such as iTunes) to a device capable of playing it; legal sales of music downloads have been monitored and charted in the United Kingdom since 2004. , the UK's most-downloaded song of all time is "Happy" by Pharrell Williams, which topped both the UK Singles Downloads Chart and UK Singles Chart.

The first single to sell 1 million downloads in the UK was "I Gotta Feeling" by The Black Eyed Peas and "Someone like You" and "Set Fire to the Rain" by Adele are the best-selling downloads by a female artist. The best-selling song not to top the UK Singles Chart is "Moves Like Jagger" by Maroon 5 featuring Christina Aguilera, whilst the best-selling song not to top the Download Chart is "Love the Way You Lie" by Eminem featuring Rihanna, which peaked at number two.

Most-downloaded songs

Most-downloaded songs by year

References

External links
Official UK Download Chart at MTV UK
Singles Download Chart at the Official Charts Company

Music downloads